Dare is a city in Dili District and is about 30 minutes away from Dili. Beginning in 1950, it has been home to the Roman Catholic Seminary of Our Lady of Fatima, the only tertiary-level educational institution in Portuguese Timor.

Located in Dare is the Dare Memorial, dedicated to the East Timorese people, built by the Australian Forces that fought in Timor during World War II.

References

Populated places in Dili District